The discography of American rapper and singer Post Malone consists of four studio albums, one mixtape, and 42 
singles (including 12 as a featured artist). According to the Recording Industry Association of America (RIAA), he has sold 13 million albums in the United States and 95 million digital singles, making him the eighth best-selling digital artist of all time. Malone was ranked by Billboard as the tenth top artist of the 2010s. On August 26, 2016, Malone released his debut mixtape, August 26.

On December 9, 2016, Malone released his debut studio album, Stoney. The album reached number four on the Billboard 200. It produced the top-10 single, "Congratulations", which features Quavo and reached number eight on the Billboard Hot 100, as well as the 20 single, "White Iverson" from 2015, which reached number 14 on the Hot 100. 

On April 27, 2018, Malone released his second studio album, Beerbongs & Bentleys. The album debuted and peaked atop the Billboard 200, giving him his first chart-topping project. It produced the number-one singles, "Rockstar" from 2017 and "Psycho", which feature 21 Savage and Ty Dolla Sign, respectively, as well as a top-ten single, "Better Now", which reached number three on the Billboard Hot 100. The album also produced the top-20 single, "Ball for Me", which features Nicki Minaj and charted at number 16 on the Hot 100. Later that year, Malone released a collaboration with Swae Lee, "Sunflower", which reached the top position on the Hot 100, becoming his third number-one single.

On September 6, 2019, Malone released his third studio album, Hollywood's Bleeding. The album debuted and peaked atop the Billboard 200, giving him his second chart-topping project. It produced the number-one singles, "Circles", as well as "Sunflower". The album also produced the top-10 singles, "Wow", "Goodbyes", which features Young Thug, and "Take What You Want", which features Ozzy Osbourne and Travis Scott; the songs reached number two, number three, and number eight on the Billboard Hot 100, respectively. It also produced the top-20 single, "Enemies", which charted at number 16 on the Hot 100, and the top-40 single, "Allergic", which charted at number 37 on the Hot 100. In 2020, Malone was featured alongside Clever on Justin Bieber's song, "Forever", which debuted and peaked at number 24 on the Hot 100. In 2021, he released the single, "Motley Crew", which debuted and peaked at number 13 on the Hot 100.

On June 3, 2022, Malone released his fourth studio album, Twelve Carat Toothache. The album debuted and peaked at number two on the Billboard 200. It produced two top-10 singles: "One Right Now" from 2021, a collaboration with the Weeknd, which debuted and peaked at number six on the Billboard Hot 100 and "I Like You (A Happier Song)", which features Doja Cat and debuted at nine, later peaking at number three on the Billboard Hot 100. It also produced the top-20 single, "Cooped Up", which features Roddy Ricch and reached number 12 on the Hot 100.

Albums

Studio albums

Mixtapes

Singles

As lead artist

As featured artist

Promotional singles

Other charted and certified songs

Guest appearances

Music videos

As lead artist

As featured artist

Notes

References 

Post Malone
Discographies of American artists
Hip hop discographies
Pop music discographies